Walter Kirschbaum is a retired West German slalom canoeist who competed in the early-to-mid 1950s. He won a gold medal in the folding K-1 event at the 1953 ICF Canoe Slalom World Championships in Meran.

References

German male canoeists
Living people
Year of birth missing (living people)
Medalists at the ICF Canoe Slalom World Championships